Kalanwali Assembly constituency is one of the 90 assembly constituencies of Haryana, a northern state of India. Kalan Wali is also part of Sirsa Lok Sabha constituency. It is a reserved seat for the Scheduled caste (SC).

Members of Legislative Assembly

 2009: Charanjeet Singh, Shiromani Akali Dal
 2014: Balkaur Singh, Shiromani Akali Dal
 2019: Sheeshpal Singh Keherwala, Indian National Congress

See also

 Kalan Wali
 List of constituencies of the Haryana Legislative Assembly

References

Assembly constituencies of Haryana
Sirsa, Haryana
Sirsa district